Nicolás Pizarro (born 29 September 1978) is a Mexican equestrian. He competed in two events at the 2012 Summer Olympics.

References

1978 births
Living people
Mexican male equestrians
Olympic equestrians of Mexico
Equestrians at the 2012 Summer Olympics
Sportspeople from Mexico City